The Global Media AIDS Initiative (GMAI) is an umbrella organization that unites and motivates media companies around the world to use their influence, resources, and creative talent to address AIDS. The GMAI creates a framework for sharing television and radio programming among media companies in order to increase public health messaging. The organization also educates journalists, editors and producers on how to cover the issue. HIV is preventable, and GMAI members aim to improve public awareness and knowledge to help stem the spread of HIV/AIDS.

Within the GMAI, there are five national and regional coalitions of media companies. As of July 2009, the media initiatives in Africa, Asia, Russia, Latin America and the Caribbean included over 300 member broadcasters total. The GMAI was conceived and organized by the Kaiser Family Foundation and UNAIDS with financial support from the Bill and Melinda Gates Foundation, the Ford Foundation and the Elton John AIDS Foundation.

Mission 

The mission of the GMAI is to leverage the power of media to help prevent the spread of HIV and reduce the stigma facing those already living with the disease.

History 

United Nations Secretary-General Kofi Annan convened a meeting in New York in January 2004 to launch the GMAI. At the meeting, the Secretary-General asked the executives of 20 media corporations from 13 countries to pledge their companies’ commitment and resources to raising the level of public awareness and
understanding about AIDS. 

By the Spring of 2005, UN Secretary-General Kofi Annan decide to hand over the leadership of the GMAI to media leaders, as envisaged by its founders. The transfer of leadership was made official during a second GMAI Summit at the annual MIP TV festival in Cannes, France. Bill Roedy, Vice Chair of MTV Networks and President of MTV Networks International, took over as Chairman. Bill Roedy formed the Leadership Committee of media executives to oversee the GMAI. Over the next 18 months, he challenged media companies on five fronts, including a commitment to airtime of HIV prevention messages, production of content offered right-free and cost-free, appropriate messaging tailored for local audiences, a workplace policy and an active partnership.

In December 2006, Bill Roedy handed over the chair of the GMAI Leadership Committee to Dali Mpofu, former CEO of the  South African Broadcasting Corporation (SABC). Today, implementing partners from each of the GMAI's five regional partnerships coordinate and oversee the GMAI.

Regional broadcast initiatives 

Since its first inauguration, regional coalitions have been forming within the GMAI. The regional coalitions produce and share culturally relevant public service announcements, news, and entertainment programming on HIV/AIDS. Campaigns include not only radio and television pieces, but a range of platforms like consumer product labeling, billboard advertising, and mobile phone messaging. Many coalitions also provide training for media representatives in their region. Below are the official links to these campaigns.
 Global Media Aids Initiative  
 Africa Broadcast Media Partnership Against HIV/AIDS  
 Asia-Pacific Media AIDS Initiative  
 Caribbean Broadcast Media Partnership on HIV/AIDS 
 Latin American Media AIDS Initiative 
 Russian Media Partnership on HIV/AIDS

Supporting partners 
 The Henry J. Kaiser Family Foundation 
 UNAIDS 
 Ford Foundation 
 The Bill and Melinda Gates Foundation 
 The Elton John AIDS Foundation

Relevant research 

The British Medical Journal published an article on determining the most cost and health effective way of treating HIV patients and preventing further spread of HIV (Hogan, D.R., et al., 2005). The article concluded that the most cost-effective way of reducing HIV transmission could be using mass media campaigns - reaching the greatest number of people using the lowest budget (Hogan, D.R., et al., 2005). Using the power of the media, the GMAI can be a significant contributor to preventing the spread of HIV/AIDS.

References 
 The Global Media AIDS Initiative  

HIV/AIDS activism
 Hogan, D. R., Baltussen, R., Hayashi, C., Lauer, J. A., & Salomon, J. A. (2005). Achieving the millennium development goals for health - Cost-effectiveness analysis of strategies to combat HIV/AIDS in developing countries. British Medical Journal, 331, 1431–1435.